NKG or nkg may refer to:

 NKG, the IATA code for Nanjing Lukou International Airport, Jiangsu, China
 nkg, the ISO 639-3 code for Nekgini language, Papua New Guinea